Polbo á feira (literally meaning "fair-style octopus", pulpo a la gallega in Spanish, meaning Galician-style octopus), alternatively known as pulpo estilo feira, is a traditional Galician dish.

This dish is prepared by first boiling the octopus inside a copper cauldron. Before boiling it, the octopus' tentacles are dipped in and out of the boiling water three times, while being held by its head—this is meant to curl the tips of the tentacles. The tentacles are preferred over the head, which sometimes is discarded. After the octopus has been boiled, it is trimmed with scissors, sprinkled with coarse salt and both sweet and spicy paprika (known in Galicia as pemento and pemento picante) and drizzled with olive oil. The optimal cooking point is reached when the octopus is not rubbery but not overcooked, similarly to the al dente concept when cooking pasta. This is after approximately a 20–45 minutes boil (approximately 15 min/kg octopus), provided the octopus is left to rest for a further 20 minutes inside the boiled water away from the fire.

The dish is traditionally served on wooden plates with bread. Tradition dictates that water should not be drunk when eating octopus, so the dish is usually served accompanied by young Galician red wine.

Traditionally, this diatopic use of octopus was facilitated by its inland availability as stockfish. In the last decades, frozen octopus has replaced dried octopus. Fresh octopus is not so frequently used nowadays either, as it is necessary to pound it heavily before cooking to avoid the dish becoming rubbery. This procedure can be skipped after freezing, which, unlike other seafood, does not alter the organoleptic properties of octopus.

The provinces of Ourense and Lugo have a reputation for good octopus cooking. Fair-style octopus is the totemic food of the patron saint festivities of Lugo (San Froilán). Some Galician cooks specialize in this dish. They are usually women, known as polbeiras. After the modern decline of traditional rural fairs, many polbeiras (octopus restaurants) have sprouted across Galicia. They tend to be rustic eateries rather than fancy restaurants.

See also

 List of seafood dishes

References

External links 
 Galician Octopus Recipe by Clay Douglass

Galician cuisine
Spanish cuisine
Octopus dishes
National dishes
Tapas